2,3-Methylenedioxyamphetamine (2,3-MDA) or ORTHO-MDA is an amphetamine derivative which is mentioned in PIHKAL as a fairly potent and long-lasting stimulant drug, but with little or none of the entactogenic effects associated with its better-known structural isomer MDA.

References

External links 
 MDA entry in PiHKAL
 MDA entry in PiHKAL • info

Substituted amphetamines
Benzodioxoles